Eladio Carrión Morales (born November 14, 1994) is an American rapper and singer of Latin trap and reggaeton.

Biography 
Eladio Carrión was born in Kansas City, Missouri, to a Puerto Rican family. Because his father was in the military, they constantly moved. Throughout his childhood he lived in Hawaii, Baltimore, New York, and Alaska. At age 11 he moved to live in Humacao, Puerto Rico. In his youth he developed skills for sports such as swimming, coming to represent Puerto Rico at the 2010 Central American and Caribbean Games and at the 2011 Pan American Games in Guadalajara, the latter where he reached the preliminary phase of the 200-meter breaststroke, managing to reach eighth position.

Career

Influencer 
Shortly after 2012, he abandoned the sport and began his artistic career as an influencer through digital platforms such as Vine and Instagram, in which he uploaded comedic videos which helped him gain followers.

Musical artist

Beginning 
In 2015 he released his first musical work "2x2" in collaboration with Flowsito. Then he released his second musical work "No Quiero Más Amigos Nuevos" belonging to Rawenz, these works allowed him to become known in the music industry. In 2016 he worked with Jon Z and the Argentine rapper Neo Pistea on the single "Súbelo" that became popular in nightclubs and again with Rawenz on "Si Te Vas, Vete".

2017–2019: "Mi Cubana" and collaborations 
In 2017 he officially debuted as a singer with the single "Me Enamoré de una Yal" with Ele A el Dominio and Ñengo Flow, under the Los de la Nazza record label, which reached the top positions on SoundCloud and Spotify.

In 2018 he collaborated on the singles "Dame una Hora" with Amenazzy, "Mi Cubana" which had a resounding success that led him to obtain a remix with Cazzu, Khea and Ecko, and "Sigue Bailándome" with Myke Towers, Darkiel, Brray and Yann C.

In 2019 he was again collaborating with artists such as Rauw Alejandro in "Dice Que No", Ñejo in "Periódico de Ayer", Noriel "Se Moja" and his most important collaboration was with the Spanish rapper Maikel Delacalle in "Si Tú Me Quisieras". In that same year, after making several collaborations, he was nominated for the Premios Juventud in the category of Nueva generación urbana, this being his first nomination for a musical award.

2020: Sauce Boyz 
On January 31, 2020, he released his debut album Sauce Boyz under the Rimas Entertainment label, which ranked #8 on the Billboard Top Latin Albums for 10 consecutive weeks, it was then followed by an EP Sauce Boyz Care Package. In that same year he was nominated for the Latin Grammy Awards in the category of Best Rap/Hip Hop Song for his joint collaboration with Bad Bunny on the single "Kemba Walker".

2021–present: Monarca and Sauce Boyz 2 
On January 8, 2021, he released his album Monarca, which includes collaborations with J Balvin, Yandel, Cazzu and Lunay, the album reached the top positions on the US Billboard charts as they were #11 on Top Latin Albums and #8 Latin Rhythm Albums. It was also nominated for a Latin Grammy in the category of Mejor Álbum de Música Urbana, although it would not ultimately win.

On June 9, he collaborated with Argentine producer Bizarrap on the single "Eladio Carrión: Bzrp Music Sessions, Vol. 40" which reached #10 on the Billboard Argentina Hot 100 list. and #162 at the global level, it was also certified gold by the PROMUSICAE of Spain. On July 6 of that same year, he released his first mixtape titled Sen2 Kbrn, Vol. 1, this featured singles such as "5 Star", "Guerrero", "Sauce Boy Freestyle 4", among others. It also peaked at #20 on the Top Latin Albums.

On December 2, 2021, he released his third studio album Sauce Boyz 2, a sequel to Sauce Boyz, this featured collaborations with international artists such as Arcángel, Bizarrap, Duki, Jay Wheeler, Jon Z, Karol G, Luar la L, Rels B, Sech, Myke Towers, Nicky Jam, Noriel, and Ovi.

Discography 
Since he began his career in 2015, Carrión has released a total of 5 (five) studio albums and two mixtapes.

Studio albums 
 Sauce Boyz and Sauce Boyz Care Package (2020)
 Monarca (2021)
 Sauce Boyz 2 (2021)
 3men2 Kbrn (2023)

Mixtapes 
 Sen2 Kbrn, Vol. 1 (2021)
 Sen2 Kbrn, Vol. 2 (2022)

Awards and nominations

References 

1994 births
Living people
American rappers
American hip hop singers
American musicians of Puerto Rican descent
American people of Puerto Rican descent
American reggaeton musicians
Latin Grammy Award winners
Latin music songwriters
Latin trap musicians
Urbano musicians
Competitors at the 2010 Central American and Caribbean Games
Swimmers at the 2011 Pan American Games
Musicians from Kansas City, Missouri
People from Humacao, Puerto Rico